The Ambassador of Malaysia to the Republic of Azerbaijan is the head of Malaysia's diplomatic mission to Azerbaijan. The position has the rank and status of an Ambassador Extraordinary and Plenipotentiary and is based in the Embassy of Malaysia, Baku.

List of heads of mission

Ambassadors to Azerbaijan

See also
 Azerbaijan–Malaysia relations

References 

 
Azerbaijan
Malaysia